Marcell Deák-Nagy (born 28 January 1992) is a Hungarian sprinter who specialises in the 200 and 400 metres.

At the 2010 World Junior Championships in Athletics in Moncton, Canada, Deák-Nagy won a silver medal over 400 metres.

At the 2012 European Athletics Championships in Helsinki, Finland, he won a silver medal over 400 metres.

Personal best

References

External links

1992 births
Living people
Hungarian male sprinters
Athletes (track and field) at the 2012 Summer Olympics
Olympic athletes of Hungary
European Athletics Championships medalists
Universiade medalists in athletics (track and field)
Universiade gold medalists for Hungary
Medalists at the 2011 Summer Universiade
20th-century Hungarian people
21st-century Hungarian people